The Sperillen Line is an abandoned railway which ran through Ringerike in Viken county, Norway. 

The rail line had additional stations and stops at Hallingby, Somma,
and Ringmoen at the south end of Lake Sperillen.
 
The steam ship DS Bægna had provided ferry and freight transport service from the southern end of Lake Sperillen to  Sørum at Sør-Aurdal  in Oppland at the northern end.  Bægna went in service from her maiden voyage on 13 October 1868 and continued in traffic until 1929, when it was replaced with a motor ship, DS Spirillen.  In 1921, Parliament voted to build a railway between the  Randsfjord Line and a new port at Finsand on Lake Sperillen to connected for the ferry service. In 1933, passenger service on the rail line was terminated, as was the ferry traffic on Lake Spirillen. Freight trains on the rail line were terminated in 1957.

References

External links
Sperillen Line in Norsk Jernbaneklubbs station database 

Railway lines in Viken
Railway lines opened in 1932
1932 establishments in Norway